Vibration Cooking: Or, the Travel Notes of a Geechee Girl is the 1970 debut book by Vertamae Smart-Grosvenor and combines recipes with storytelling. It was published by Doubleday. A second edition was published in 1986, and a third edition was published in 1992. The University of Georgia published another edition in 2011. Smart-Grosvenor went on to publish more cookbooks after Vibration Cooking. Vibration Cooking raised awareness about Gullah culture. Scholar Anne E. Goldman compared Vibration Cooking with Jessica Harris' Iron Pots and Wooden Spoons, arguing that, in both books, "the model of the self... is historicized by being developed in the context of colonialism." Scholar Lewis V. Baldwin recommended Vibration Cooking for its "interesting and brilliant insights on the social significance of food and eating and their relationship to 'place' in a southern context." The book inspired filmmaker Julie Dash to make the film Daughters of the Dust, which won awards at the Sundance Film Festival.

References

Bibliography

1970 books
Debut books
American cookbooks
African-American autobiographies
Gullah culture
Doubleday (publisher) books
Soul food
Books about race and ethnicity
Literature by African-American women